Lake Singrenacocha (possibly from Quechua sinkriy to walk in a line / to string, sikriy, sinri to string beads, -na a suffix, qucha lake) or Sigrenacocha is a lake in Peru located in the Cusco Region, Quispicanchi Province, Ocongate District. Singrenacocha lies in the Vilcanota mountain range, northwest of the larger Lake Sibinacocha and north of the Callangate massif.

References 

Singrenacocha
Singrenacocha